Denmark participated in the Eurovision Song Contest 2022 in Turin, Italy, with "The Show" performed by the band Reddi. The Danish broadcaster DR organised the national final  2022 in order to select the Danish entry. Eight songs competed in a televised show where "The Show" performed by Reddi was the winner as decided upon through two rounds of public voting.

Denmark was drawn to compete in the first semi-final of the Eurovision Song Contest which took place on 10 May 2022. Performing during the show in position 12, "The Show" was not announced among the top 10 entries of the first semi-final and therefore did not qualify to compete in the final. It was later revealed that Denmark placed thirteenth out of the 17 participating countries in the semi-final with 55 points.

Background 

The Danish national broadcaster, DR, broadcasts the event within Denmark and organises the selection process for the nation's entry. DR confirmed their intentions to participate at the 2022 Eurovision Song Contest on 1 July 2021. Denmark has selected all of their Eurovision entries thus far through the national final . On 27 August 2021, the broadcaster announced that  would be organised in order to select Denmark's entry for the 2022 contest.

Before Eurovision

Dansk Melodi Grand Prix 2022 
The show was televised on DR1 as well as streamed online at the broadcaster's streaming service DR TV and the official DR website. The national final was watched by 985,000 viewers in Denmark.

Format 
Eight songs, all accompanied by the DR Grand Prix orchestra, competed in one show where the winner was determined over two rounds of public voting. In the first round, the top three songs qualified to the superfinal, during which the winner was determined. Viewers were able to vote via SMS or a mobile application specifically designed for the competition. Prior to the show, the public was provided with one free vote on the app to cast a vote each day between 28 February 2022 and 4 March 2022, while viewers using the app during the show were provided with two free votes.

Competing entries 
DR opened a submission period between 27 August 2021 and 29 October 2021 for artists and composers to submit their entries. The broadcaster stated that the competition would seek out songs that "represent the quality and breadth of the Danish music scene" with emphasis on songs that "have the potential to represent Danish music and Danish culture in the most distinguished way at the Eurovision Song Contest". A six-member selection committee selected eight songs from the entries submitted to the broadcaster. The committee was composed of Lars Trillingsgaard (head of music strategy for DR), Lotte Friis (radio host on DR P4), Maria Fantino (radio host on DR P3), Andrew Jensen (radio host on DR P4), Mathias Buch Jensen (head of music of DR P3) and Bettina Skriver (producer of ).

Final 
The final took place on 5 March 2022. The running order was determined by DR and announced on 20 February 2022. In the first round of voting the top three advanced to the superfinal based on the votes of a public vote. In the week leading up to the show, viewers could vote through the DR Grand Prix app. During the show, viewers could via through SMS and the app. In the first round of voting the top three advanced to the superfinal based on the votes of a public vote. The three songs with the most votes received pre-show were each awarded with 10% of the total votes, while the three songs with the most votes received through SMS and app voting were each awarded with 12% and 78% of the total votes, respectively. In the superfinal, the winner, "The Show" performed by Reddi, was selected solely by the public vote through SMS (24%) and app voting (76%). In addition to the performances of the competing entries, the competition was opened by Danish Eurovision Song Contest 2021 representatives .

At Eurovision 

According to Eurovision rules, all nations with the exceptions of the host country and the "Big Five" (France, Germany, Italy, Spain, and the United Kingdom) are required to qualify from one of two semi-finals in order to compete for the final; the top ten countries from each semi-final progress to the final. The European Broadcasting Union (EBU) split up the competing countries into six different pots based on voting patterns from previous contests, with countries with favorable voting histories put into the same pot. On 25 January 2022, an allocation draw was held which placed each country into one of the two semi-finals, as well as which half of the show they would perform in. Denmark was placed into the first semi-final, which was held on 10 May 2022, and was scheduled to perform in the second half of the show.

Once all the competing songs for the 2022 contest had been released, the running order for the semi-finals was decided by the shows' producers rather than through another draw, so that similar songs were not placed next to each other.

The Danish spokesperson, who announced the top 12-point score awarded by the Danish jury during the final, was Tina Müller.

Semi-final

Reddi took part in technical rehearsals on 1 and 5 May, followed by dress rehearsals on 9 and 10 May. This included the jury show on 9 May where the professional juries of each country watched and voted on the competing entries.

The Danish performance featured the members of Reddi dressed in colourful retro-inspired outfits and performing in a band set-up. The performance began with lead singer Mathilde Savery at the piano before joining the other members as the song progressed. The stage colours were predominantly yellow, red, blue and green and the LED screens displayed the band name. The performance also featured the use of pyrotechnics.

At the end of the show, Denmark was not announced among the top 10 entries in the first semi-final and therefore failed to qualify to compete in the final. It was later revealed that Denmark placed thirteenth in the semi-final, receiving a total of 55 points: 20 points from the televoting and 35 points from the juries.

Voting 

Below is a breakdown of points awarded to Denmark during the first semi-final. Voting during the three shows involved each country awarding two sets of points from 1-8, 10 and 12: one from their professional jury and the other from televoting. The exact composition of the professional jury, and the results of each country's jury and televoting were released after the final; the individual results from each jury member were also released in an anonymised form. The Danish jury consisted of DJ Speakr, Jonas Flodager Rasmussen, who represented Denmark in the Eurovision Song Contest 2018, Kirstine Stubbe Teglbjærg, Lars Trillingsgaard, and Mekdes. In the first semi-final, Denmark finished in thirteenth place out of seventeen entries, marking the country's second consecutive non-qualification from the semi-finals.

Points awarded to Denmark

Points awarded by Denmark

Detailed voting results 
The following members comprised the Danish jury:
 DJ Speakr – music producer, DJ and member of Fuld Effekt
 Jonas Flodager Rasmussen – singer, actor, represented Denmark in the Eurovision Song Contest 2018
 Kirstine Stubbe Teglbjærg – composer, songwriter, producer
 Lars Trillingsgaard – jury chairman, music expert
 Mekdes – singer-songwriter

References

External links
 

2022
Countries in the Eurovision Song Contest 2022
Eurovision